Bornholm is a Danish island in the Baltic Sea, to the east of the rest of Denmark, south of Sweden, northeast of Germany and north of Poland. 

Strategically located, Bornholm has been fought over for centuries. It has usually been ruled by Denmark, but also by Sweden and by Lübeck. The ruin of Hammershus, at the northwestern tip of the island, is the largest medieval fortress in northern Europe, testament to the importance of its location. Bornholm and Ertholmene comprise the last remaining Danish territory in Skåneland east of Øresund, having been surrendered to Sweden in 1658, but regained by Denmark in 1660 after a local revolt.

The heat from the summer is stored in the rock formations and the weather is quite warm until October. As a result of the climate, a local variety of the common fig, known as Bornholm's Diamond (Bornholms Diamant), can grow locally on the island. The island's topography consists of dramatic rock formations in the north (unlike the rest of Denmark, which is mostly gentle rolling hills) sloping down towards pine and deciduous forests (greatly affected by storms in the 1950s), farmland in the middle and sandy beaches in the south.

The island is home to many of Denmark's round churches.

History

Medieval

In Old Norse the island was known as Burgundaholmr, and in ancient Danish especially the island's name was Borghand or Borghund; these names were related to Old Norse borg 'height' and bjarg/berg 'mountain, rock' because it is an island that rises high from the sea. Other names known for the island include Burgendaland (9th century), Hulmo / Holmus (Gesta Hammaburgensis ecclesiae pontificum), Burgundehulm (1145), and Borghandæholm (14th century). The Old English translation of Orosius uses the form Burgenda land. Some scholars believe that the Burgundians are named after Bornholm. The Burgundians were Germanic peoples who moved west when the Western Roman Empire collapsed and occupied and named Burgundy in France.

Bornholm formed part of the historical Lands of Denmark when the nation united out of a series of petty chiefdoms. It was originally administratively part of the province of Scania and was administered by the Scanian Law after this was codified in the 13th century. Control over the island evolved into a long-raging dispute between the See of Lund and the Danish crown, culminating in several battles. The first fortress on the island was Gamleborg, which was replaced by Lilleborg built by the king in 1150. In 1149 the king accepted the transfer of three of the island's four herreder (districts) to the archbishop. In 1250, the archbishop constructed his own fortress, Hammershus. A campaign launched from it in 1259 conquered the remaining part of the island including Lilleborg. The island's status remained a matter of dispute for an additional 200 years.

Modern

Bornholm was pawned to Lübeck for 50 years starting in 1525. Its first militia, Bornholms Milits, was formed in 1624. Swedish forces conquered the island in 1645, but returned the island to Denmark in the following peace settlement. After the war in 1658, Denmark ceded the island to Sweden under the Treaty of Roskilde along with the rest of the Skåneland, Bohuslän and Trøndelag, and it was occupied by Swedish forces.
A revolt broke out the same year, culminating in Villum Clausen's shooting of the Swedish commander Johan Printzensköld on 8 December 1658. Following the revolt, a deputation of islanders presented the island as a gift to King Frederick III of Denmark on the condition that the island would never be ceded again. This status was confirmed in the Treaty of Copenhagen in 1660.

Swedes, notably from Småland and Scania, emigrated to the island during the 19th century, seeking work and better conditions. Most of the migrants did not remain.

Bornholm also attracted many famous artists at the beginning of the 20th century, forming a group now known as the Bornholm school of painters. In addition to Oluf Høst, they include Karl Isaksson (1878–1922) from Sweden, and the Danes Edvard Weie (1879–1943), Olaf Rude (1886–1957), Niels Lergaard (1893–1982), and Kræsten Iversen (1886–1955).

German and Soviet occupation 
Bornholm, as a part of Denmark, was captured by Nazi Germany on 10 April 1940, and served as a lookout post and listening station during the war, as it was a part of the Eastern Front. The island's perfect central position in the Baltic Sea meant that it was an important "natural fortress" between Germany and Sweden, effectively keeping submarines and destroyers away from Nazi-occupied waters. Several concrete coastal installations were built during the war, as well as several coastal batteries, which had tremendous range. However, none of them were ever used, and only a single test shot was fired during the occupation. These remnants of Nazi rule have since fallen into disrepair and are mostly regarded today as historical curiosities. Many tourists visit the ruins each year, however, providing supplemental income to the tourist industry.

On 22 August 1942 a V-1 flying bomb (numbered V83, probably launched from a Heinkel He 111) crashed on Bornholm during a test – the warhead was a dummy made of concrete. The wreckage was photographed and sketched by the Danish Naval Officer-in-Charge on Bornholm, Lieutenant Commander Hasager Christiansen. This was one of the first signs British Intelligence saw of Germany's aspirations to develop flying bombs and rockets which were to become known as V-1. The Bornholm rocket turned out to be from Peenemünde.

Bornholm was heavily bombarded by the Soviet Air Forces in May 1945, as it was a part of the Eastern Front. The German garrison commander, German Navy Captain Gerhard von Kamptz (1902–1998), refused to surrender to the Soviets, as his orders were to surrender only to the Western Allies. The Germans sent several telegrams to Copenhagen requesting that at least one British soldier should be transferred to Bornholm, so that the Germans could surrender to the Western Allied forces instead of the Soviets. When von Kamptz failed to provide a written capitulation as demanded by the Soviet commanders, Soviet aircraft relentlessly bombed and destroyed more than 800 civilian houses in Rønne and in Nexø, and seriously damaged roughly 3,000 more on 7–8 May 1945. The population had been forewarned of the bombardments, and the towns were evacuated, but 10 local people were killed. Soldiers were also killed and wounded. Some of them were conscripts from occupied Latvia fighting in German ranks against the Soviets.

During the Soviet bombing of the two main towns on 7-8 May, Danish radio was not allowed to broadcast the news because it was thought it would spoil the liberation festivities in Denmark. On 9 May Soviet troops landed on the island, and after a short fight, the German garrison (about 12,000 strong) surrendered. Soviet forces left the island on 5 April 1946 as part of the post-war division of interests of the Soviet Union and the Western Allies. Denmark was to be Western aligned, and in return Estonia, Latvia and Lithuania were to be kept under Soviet occupation.

Cold War
After the evacuation of their forces from Bornholm, the Soviets took the position that the stationing of foreign troops on Bornholm would be considered a declaration of war against the Soviet Union, and that Denmark should keep troops on it at all times to protect it from such foreign aggression. This policy remained in force after NATO was formed, with Denmark as a founding member. The Soviets accepted the stationing there of Danish troops, which were part of NATO but viewed as militarily inferior elements of the alliance, but they strongly objected to the presence of other NATO troops on Bornholm, US troops in particular.

On 5 March 1953, the day of Stalin's death, Polish pilot Franciszek Jarecki defected from the Eastern Bloc and landed a MiG-15 fighter on the island. He was later granted asylum and rewarded for providing Western intelligence with the then-newest Soviet jet fighter.

In 2017, Denmark's Defence Intelligence Service decided to build a listening tower near Østermarie, almost 90 meters high, to intercept radio communications across the Baltic Sea and in parts of Russia.

Municipality 

 
 

Bornholm Regional Municipality is the local authority (Danish, kommune) covering the entire island. Its formal name is Bornholm Municipality. It is given the right in the law establishing it to be called Bornholm Regional Municipality. (For explanation read on). It is the result of a merger of the five former (1 April 1970 until 2002) municipalities on the island (Allinge-Gudhjem, Hasle, Nexø, Rønne and Aakirkeby) and the former Bornholm County. Bornholm Regional Municipality was also a county in its own right during its first four years from 1 January 2003 until 31 December 2006. From 1 January 2007 all counties were abolished, and Bornholm became part of the Capital Region of Denmark whose main responsibility is the health service. In the bill (Danish forslag) (Bill of Law on merger of the municipalities of Bornholm) presented 30 January 2002 by the Minister of Interior and Health to Folketinget, it says in §1 that (1st sentence) "The 1st of January 2003 Bornholm Municipality is established by a merger of (names of municipalities mentioned, and county's name mentioned), and (2nd sentence) Bornholm Municipality is called Bornholm Regional Municipality". 

The island had 21 municipalities until March 1970, of which 6 were market towns and 15 parishes. In addition to supervising parish municipalities, which was the responsibility of the counties in all of Denmark, the market town municipalities of Bornholm were supervised by Bornholm County as well and not by the Interior Ministry as was the case in the rest of Denmark. The seat of the municipal council is the island's main town, Rønne. The voters decided to merge the county with the municipalities in a referendum 29 May 2001, effective from 1 January 2003. The question on the ballot was, "Do you want the six municipal entities of Bornholm to be joined to form one municipal entity as of 1 January 2003?" 73.9% voted in favour. The lowest percentage for the merger was in Nexø municipality (966 more people voting "Yes" than "No"), whose mayor, Annelise Molin, a Social Democrat, spoke out against the merger. It was required that each municipality had more "Yes" votes than "No" votes. Otherwise the merger would have to be abandoned altogether. The six municipal entities had up to 122 councillors (of which county clls were 18, from 1998 15), reduced to 89 in the municipalities from the 1990s, in the 1970s and the new regional municipality would have 27 councillors from the start 1 January 2003. They were reduced to 23 from 1 January 2018 (election November 2017). From 1 January 2003 until 31 December 2006 the 27 cllrs were called Regional Council (Danish Regionsråd), from 1 January 2007 changed to Municipal Board (Danish Kommunalbestyrelse) as is the usual term in almost all Danish municipalities. This was to avoid confusion with the Regional Council in Region Hovedstaden, and in the other regions

The merger was approved in a law by the Folketing 19 (and signature by the Queen 25) March 2002, transferring the tasks of the abolished county and old municipalities to the new Bornholm Regional Municipality. The first regional mayor in the first three years from 2003 until 2005 was Thomas Thors (born 28 July 1949), a physician and member of the Social Democrats and previously the last mayor of Rønne Municipality for five years from 1998 until 2002. He became a mayor again in 2021. Bjarne Kristiansen, who was the last mayor of Hasle  years from the summer of 2000 until 2002, representing the local Borgerlisten political party, served as mayor for four years from 1 January 2006 until 2009. From 1 January 2007, Bornholm became a part of the Capital Region of Denmark. From 1 January 2010 until 31 December 2020 the mayor was Winni Grosbøll, a high school teacher and a member of the Social Democrats (Socialdemokratiet) political party. The deputy mayor Morten Riis was mayor for a short interlude from 1 January until 4 January 2021. He is from the Red-Green Alliance. Thomas Thors, who was elected again in 2017, became mayor again from 4 January 2021. After the 2021 Danish local elections Jacob Trøst became mayor from January 2022. He is from the Conservative party. This was after an agreement (aftale om konstituering) between the Red-Green Alliance, amongst whom Morten Riis will be deputy mayor, and the Danish People's Party with the Conservatives.

Municipal council
Bornholm's municipal council today consists of 23 members, elected every four years. In the first four local elections in the newly created municipality there were 27 members elected to the municipal council. The 2002 local election only took place on Bornholm. From the election in 2017 the number of councillors elected was reduced to 23 members, serving their term of office from 1 January 2018 until 31 December 2021.

Below are the election results to the new merged municipal council beginning with the first election 29 May 2002.

Transport 

Ferry services connect Rønne to Świnoujście (Poland), Sassnitz (Germany), Køge,  by road ( as the crow flies) south of Copenhagen, Denmark; the destination to Køge replaced the nighttime route directly to and from Copenhagen (for both cargo and passengers) from 1 October 2004; and catamaran services to Ystad (Sweden). Simrishamn (Sweden) has a ferry connection during the summer. There are also regular catamaran services between Nexø and the Polish ports of Kołobrzeg, Łeba and Ustka. There are direct bus connections Ystad-Copenhagen, coordinated with the catamaran. There are also flights from Bornholm Airport to Copenhagen and other locations.

Because of its remote location Bornholm Regional Municipality has its own traffic company, BAT, and is its own employment region, and also performs other tasks normally carried out by the regions in the rest of Denmark. In some respects the municipality forms a region of its own.

Bornholm Regional Municipality was not merged with other municipalities on 1 January 2007 in the nationwide Municipal Reform of 2007.

Towns and villages
The larger towns on the island are located on the coast and have harbours. There is however one exception, centrally placed Aakirkeby, which was also the name of the municipality from 1970 until 2002, but it included the harbour of Boderne,  to the south. The largest town is Rønne; it is the seat, in the southwest on the westernmost point of the island. The other main towns (clockwise around the island) are Hasle, Sandvig, Allinge, Gudhjem, Svaneke and Nexø. Monday morning 22 September 2014 it was documented by Folkeregistret in the municipality that the number of people living in the municipality that day were 39,922, the lowest number in over 100 years.

, Statistics Denmark gave the populations as follows:

The town of Rønne after the merger of the island's administrative entities 1 January 2003 reached a low point of 13,568 inhabitants 1 January 2014. 15,957 people in 1965 (date unknown;number not registerbased) lived in the two parishes that would become Rønne municipality from 1 April 1970.  In the table, numbers for Rønne are for the parish of Rønne, Rønne Sogn, alone. The year is unknown but sometime between 2000 and 2005. It does not include Knudsker Sogn, which was also part of Rønne Municipality. Other localities (with approximate populations, not updated) include Aarsballe (86), Arnager (151), Olsker (67), Rutsker (64), Rø (181), Stenseby (?) and Vang (92). In 2010 and 2018 10,297 and 9,111 respectively lived in rural districts, and 88 and 71 had no fixed address. A rural district is defined by Statistics Denmark as a settlement with less than 200 inhabitants.

Demography

Population of parishes
Year: Beginning with 2007; 2018;
 7552. Rønne 11,752; 11,539;
 7553. Knudsker 2,821; 2,729;
 7554. Vestermarie 1,460; 1,324;
 7555. Nylarsker 924; 832;
 7556. Nyker 1,737; 1,628;
 7557. Hasle 1,887; 1,747;
 7558. Rutsker 684; 570;
 7559. Olsker 1,556; 1,266;
 7560. Allinge-Sandvig 1,860; 1,527;
 7561. Klemensker 1,737; 1,555;
 7562. Rø 503; 418;
 7563. Ibsker 1,322; 1,148;
 7564. Svaneke 1,082; 981;
 7565. Østerlarsker 997; 811;
 7566. Gudhjem 752; 677;
 7567. Østermarie 1,624; 1,458;
 7568. Christiansø 95; 83;
 7569. Aaker 3,479; 3,201;
 7570. Bodilsker 981; 849;
 7571. Nexø 3,884; 3,670;
 7572. Poulsker 1,215; 1,061;
 7573. Pedersker 715; 570;
Population numbers are from 1 January. Christiansø Parish (which encompasses Ertholmene) is not a part of Bornholm Regional Municipality. It is included because Danmarks Statistik includes it as parish number 7568. Bornholm has 21 parishes (2018) that before 1 April 1970 were parish (15) or market city (6) municipalities themselves. There are 2,158 parishes (2021) in the Church of Denmark.

Source:Statistikbanken.dk/Befolkning og valg/(table)FODIE (births);FOD207 (deaths);BEV107 (births;deaths;birth surplus);KM1 (parishes).

On 22 September 2014 population numbers showed fewer than 40,000 inhabitants on the island for the first time in over 100 years. The Folkeregister in the municipality could document 39,922 inhabitants in the municipality on that date.

Language

Many inhabitants speak the Bornholmsk dialect, which is officially a dialect of Danish. Bornholmsk retains three grammatical genders, like Faroese, Icelandic and most dialects of Norwegian, but unlike standard Danish. Its phonology includes archaisms (unstressed  and internal , where other dialects have  and ) and innovations ( for  before and after front-tongue vowels). This makes the dialect difficult to understand for some Danish speakers. However, Swedish speakers often consider Bornholmian to be easier to understand than standard Danish. The intonation resembles the dialects spoken in nearby Scania, Blekinge and Halland the southernmost provinces of Sweden.

Religion 
Most inhabitants are members of the Lutheran Church of Denmark (Folkekirken). Various Christian denominations have become established on the island, most during the 19th century.
Folkekirken (State church) (1536)
Baptist church (1843)
The Church of Jesus Christ of Latter-day Saints (LDS Church) (1850)
Methodist church (1895)
Jehovah's Witnesses (1897)
Roman Catholic Church (ca 1150–1536, 1849)

Sights and landmarks

On the surface of Bornholm older geological formations can be seen better than in the rest of Denmark. Stubbeløkken – which is still operating (Danish i drift) – and Klippeløkken granite quarries in Knudsker parish just east of central Rønne – and statistically a part of the town – are among the few remaining quarries of what was once many active quarries on the island. The island's varied geography and seascapes attract visitors to its many beauty spots from the Hammeren promontory in the northwest to the Almindingen forest in the centre and the Dueodde beaches in the southeast. Of special interest are the rocky sea cliffs at Jons Kapel and Helligdomsklipperne, the varied topography of Paradisbakkerne and rift valleys such as Ekkodalen and Døndalen. Bornholm's numerous windmills include the post mill of Egeby and the well-kept Dutch mill at Aarsdale.

Examples of roads that have (very) steep climbs and descents are: (inland) Simblegårdsvej in Klemensker, which begins by the village inn Klemens Kro, and Slamrebjergvej just outside Nexø extending northward from the main road from Rønne. Along the coast there are several steep roads, which is also the case in some parts of Denmark as a whole, for instance in and around Vejle.

The island hosts examples of 19th- and early-20th-century architecture, and about 300 wooden houses in Rønne and Nexø, donated by Sweden after World War II, when the island was repairing damage caused by the war.
The island is home to 15 medieval churches, four of which are round churches with unique artwork and architecture. The ancient site of Rispebjerg has remains of sun temples from the Neolithic and earthworks from the Iron Age.

There are 14 European bison near Åkirkeby, attracting 100,000 visitors a year.

Education 
Because of the dilapidated state of their buildings, all secondary educational facilities in Rønne, including adult evening classes, are being transferred to new facilities at Campus Bornholm in 2018. Campus Bornholm is a merger formed in June 2010 consisting of Bornholms Erhvervsskole (youth and adults), Bornholm High School (youth) and VUC Bornholm (adults), then occupying separate addresses. Learning institutions not part of this formalised collaboration will also be housed at Minervavej in Rønne. The building costs were over 300 million DKK (US$46.9 million (29 June 2018)). The A.P. Møller Foundation contributed a sum of 56 million DKK (US$8.76 million (29 June 2018)) to the project.

Economy
Among Bornholm's chief industrial activities are dairy farming and arts and crafts industries such as glass production and pottery using locally worked clay. 
Jensen-Group, an industrial washing and folding machine company, was founded on the island and has a factory in Rønne. It is headquartered in Belgium.

Tourism is also important during the summer months.

Electricity supply
Bornholm is connected to the Swedish electricity grid by a submarine 60 kV AC cable, which is among the longest AC cables in Europe. This cable is capable of delivering all the electrical energy consumed on Bornholm. However Bornholm also generates its own electricity at small thermal power plants and especially wind turbines.

Bornholm is also home to a large internationally funded demonstration project to test the viability of novel energy market mechanisms to regulate energy networks with a high prevalence of renewables (such as wind turbines and photovoltaics). 50% of the EcoGrid project is EU-funded, with the remainder coming mainly from large corporations.

Military

Bornholm hosts a Marines like squadron (4th Basic Training Squadron), of the Guard Hussar Regiment at Almegårds Kaserne.

Climate
Bornholm has an oceanic climate relatively similar to southern Sweden and mainland Denmark, whose summer highs and winter lows are heavily moderated by its maritime and isolated position. Though intense heat is rare, the climate is sunny during summer and rainfall is generally sparse for a climate of this type. The winter of 2010 – 2011 was exceptionally extreme with snow depth reaching at least 146 cm (58 inches) and snowdrifts of six meters (20 feet), the highest in Northern Europe. Military assistance was needed to clear roadways. The DMI estimated the weight of snow to be 100 million tons.

Sports 

Bornholm's geography as an island and moderate climate makes Bornholm an ideal location for sailing and other water-based sports. Bornholm has also become an internationally recognised venue for 'match racing', a sailing sport where two identical yachts are raced in one-on-one events on the water. The Danish Open event was held in Bornholm in September 2010 at the port town of Rønne on the western coast of Bornholm. The five-day Danish Open is a key event in the World Match Racing Tour calendar which is one of only 3 events awarded 'special event' status by the International Sailing Federation. The Tour is the world's leading professional 'match racing' series and features a nine-event calendar which crosses three continents during the series. Points accrued during the Danish Open contribute directly to the World Match Racing Tour championship with the winner of the season finale at the Monsoon Cup in Malaysia claiming the ultimate match racing title ISAF World Match Racing Champion.

There are two small stadiums: Nexø Stadion, in Nexø, where NB Bornholm association football club play; and the slightly larger multi-use stadium Rønne Stadion Nord in Rønne, which serves the Bornholm national football team, multi-section club most well known for athletics IK Viking, and several local football clubs. The DBU Bornholm is the local branch governing football on the island.

Cultural references
 Russian writer Nikolay Karamzin in his novella "The Island Bornholm" ("Ostrov Borngol'm") depicts formidable rocks and green meadows of the island. This story about forbidden love is considered one of the first russian gothic tales.
 The Academy Award-winning 1987 Bille August film Pelle the Conqueror, an adaptation of Martin Andersen Nexø's four volume novel by the same name, is set and was shot on the island.
 A considerable part of the Second World War spy thriller Hornet Flight by Ken Follett takes place on Bornholm, depicting the island under German occupation.
 Megaheavy by Danish filmmaker Fenar Ahmad is set on Bornholm in the 1980s. It won the Grand Prix at the 2010 Odense Film Festival.
 The 2006 film Tempelriddernes Skat (The Lost Treasure of the Knights Templar) takes place on Bornholm.
 Bornholm has an appearance in a roblox game called Dynamic ship simulator 3 made by Captainmarcin and his dev team Badyacht.
 Minor planet 4453 Bornholm is named after the island.
 The 1933 work, Folkeliv og Indstiftelser paa Bornholm, describes the culture and history of the island.

Notable residents

Arts 
 Kristian Zahrtmann (1843 in Rønne – 1917) painter, favoured naturalism and realism
 Michael Ancher (1849 in Rutsker – 1927) realist artist, painted fishermen in Skagen
 Mathias Bidstrup (1852 in Rønne – 1929) architect of many buildings on Bornholm, schools, churches (including Gudhjem Church), train stations and the post office in Rønne
 Janus Laurentius Ridter (1854 in Aakirkeby – 1921) painter and illustrator of topographical watercolours
 Julius Folkmann (1864 in Rønne – 1948) a Danish photographer and cinematographer  
 Vilhelm Herold (1865 in Hasle – 1937) operatic tenor, voice teacher, and theatre director 
 Oluf Høst (1884 in Svaneke – 1966) Expressionist painter, the only native member of the Bornholm school of painters
 Else Højgaard (1906–1979) ballerina and an actress of stage and screen, noted for her fiery temperament and edgy intensity 
 Gustaf Munch-Petersen (1912–1938) writer and painter, moved to Bornholm in 1935
 Gertrud Vasegaard (1913 in Rønne – 2007), a ceramist remembered for her stoneware, in 1933 she moved to Bornholm whence her family originated and opened a studio in Gudhjem.
 Arne Ranslet (1931–2018) sculptor and ceramist, moved to Bornholm in 1955
 Tulla Blomberg Ranslet (born 1928) Norwegian painter, moved to Bornholm in 1955
 Heather Spears (1934–2021), Canadian poet, artist, and novelist, moved to Bornholm in 1962
 Ursula Munch-Petersen (born 1937 in Rønne) ceramist
 Bente Hammer (born 1950) textile artist and fashion designer, moved to Bornholm in 1987, opened a workshop and boutique
 Pia Ranslet (born 1956 in Allinge) painter and sculptor
 Klaus Bondam (born 1963 in Aakirkeby) actor and ex-politician 
 Sofie Stougaard (born 1966 in Svaneke) actress 
 Jonas Jeberg (born 1975 in Rønne) a songwriter and music producer, lives in Los Angeles 
 Engelina Andrina Larsen (born 1978) singer and songwriter 
 Aura Dione (born 1985) pop singer and songwriter, resident on Bornholm since aged seven

Science 
 Peder Olsen Walløe (1716–1793) Dano-Norwegian Arctic explorer, explored the former Norse settlements on Greenland
 Peter Schousboe (1766 in Rønne – 1832) botanist and Danish consul general in Tangier
 Johan Nicolai Madvig (1804 in Svaneke – 1886) a Danish philologist and Kultus Minister of Denmark
 Peter Ludvig Panum (1820 in Rønne – 1885) physiologist and pathologist 
 Dr. Lilli Nielsen (1926 in Rønne – 2013) psychologist, taught blind children and those with multiple disabilities

Business 

 Hans Peder Kofoed (1743 in Svaneke – 1812) a Danish brewer, merchant and shipowner traded with Danish West Indies
 M.P. Möller (1854 in Østermarie – 1937), a pipe-organ builder and manufacturer, moved to the United States in 1872 
 Christian Schmiegelow (1859 in Rønne – 1949) a Danish businessman, co-founder of Torm
 Nicolai Nørregaard (born 1979 in Svaneke) chef and restaurateur

Public affairs 
 Jørgen Landt (1751–1804 in Olsker) a Danish priest, botanist and author
 Johan Peter Andreas Anker (1838 in Knudsker Sogn – 1876) a Danish military officer
 Johanne Münter (1844 in Rønne – 1921) a Danish women's rights activist and writer
 Martin Andersen Nexø (1869–1954) socialist writer, moved to the island aged 8 and adopted the city name
 Vilhelm Grønbech (1873 in Allinge – 1948) cultural historian and professor of the history of religion at the University of Copenhagen
 Mogens Glistrup (1926–2008) controversial politician, lawyer and tax protester 
 Flemming Kofod-Svendsen (born 1944 in Aakirkeby) an ordained minister in the Lutheran Church and politician
 Lea Wermelin (born 1985 in Rønne) a Danish politician, Minister for the Environment
 Peter Kofod Poulsen (born 1990 in Snogebæk) a Danish politician, MEP since 2019

Sport 

 Hans Colberg (1921 in Klemensker – 2007) football player, over 200 pro appearances
 Allan Kuhn (born 1968 in Rønne) a Danish association football coach and former player. 
 Julie Houmann (born in Rønne 1979) badminton player 
 Lisbet Jakobsen (born 1987 in Nexø) rower, competed at the 2016 Summer Olympics
 Magnus Cort (born 1993) professional road bicycle racer  
 Mathias Christiansen (born 1994) badminton player
 Amir Hadžiahmetović (born 1997 in Nexø) a Bosnian professional footballer

See also 

 Bornholm disease
 Battle of Bornholm (disambiguation)
 Dromaeosauroides bornholmensis, the first dinosaur found in Denmark
 Arts and Crafts movement
 List of islands of Denmark

References

Further reading 

 "The Island of Bornholm," a chapter in Selected Prose by Nikolai Mikhailovich Karamzin, 1969, Northwestern University Press.
 "The Battle of Bornholm" in The Hidden Folk: Stories of Fairies, Dwarves, Selkies, and Other Secret Beings, by Lise Lunge-Larsen, 2004, Houghton Mifflin.
 The Templars' Secret Island: The Knights, the Priest, and the Treasure, 1992, by Erling Haagensen and Henry Lincoln
 Behind the Da Vinci Code, 2006 documentary by The History Channel
 Bornholm i krig 1940–1946 (Bornholm in War), Bornholm museum, 2001, . Book of photos from World War II.
 Bent Jensen: "Soviet Remote Control: the Island of Bornholm as a Relay Station in Soviet-Danish Relations, 1945–71," in Mechanisms of Power in the Soviet Union, Macmillan Press, 2000, .
  Outlined scanian orthography including morphology and word index. First revision.
  Outlined scanian orthography including morphology and word index.

External links

 Municipality's official website (Dansk+Deutsch+English)
 Turistguide Bornholm (Dansk+Deutsch+English)
 Bornholm in pictures
 Activities on Bornholm (Dansk+Deutsch+English)
 Krak searchable/printable municipality map
 Bornholm Map and Web Index
 Bornholm's Museum (Dansk+Deutsch+English+Polski)
 Municipal statistics: NetBorger Kommunefakta, delivered from KMD a.k.a. Kommunedata (Municipal Data) (Danish)
 Bornholm (Polish)
 Frit Bårrijnhålm / Free Bornhom (Bornholmian+Danish+English)

 
Municipalities in the Capital Region of Denmark
Municipalities of Denmark
Danish islands in the Baltic
Islands of Denmark
Populated places established in 2003